Harald Freiherr von Elverfeldt (6 February 1900 – 6 March 1945) was a general in the Wehrmacht of Nazi Germany during World War II who commanded the 9th Panzer Division.  He was a recipient of the Knight's Cross of the Iron Cross with Oak Leaves.  

Throughout the 1942 and early 1943, Elverfeldt participated in several rear security operation in Belarus operations, Operation Eisvogel (Operation Kingfisher)  and Operation Zigeunerbaron (Operation Gypsy Baron).  In September 1943 he was promoted to the rank of Generalmajor and served in the Crimea.  In September 1944, after the 9th Panzer Division had fought in Normandy, Harald von Elverfeldt was given command of the division and commanded it until December 28, 1944, and then again from February 1945 until he was killed in action in March 1945 whilst defending Cologne.  Elverfeldt was awarded the Knight's Cross of the Iron Cross on 9 December 1944, and was posthumously awarded Oak Leaves on 23 March 1945, along with a promotion to Generalleutnant.

Decorations
 Iron Cross (1914) 2nd Class (17 April 1919)
 Honour Cross of the World War 1914/1918 (21 December 1934)
 Clasp to the Iron Cross (1939)  2nd Class (29 September 1939) & 1st Class (8 October 1939)
 German Cross in Gold on 16 March 1942 as Oberstleutnant im Generalstab (in the General Staff) of General-Kommando LVI. Armeekorps 
 Knight's Cross of the Iron Cross with Oak Leaves
 Knight's Cross on 9 December 1944 as Generalmajor and leader of the 9th Panzer-Division
 801st Oak Leaves on 23 March 1945 as Generalleutnant and commander of the 9th Panzer-Division

References

Citations

Bibliography

 Mitcham, Samuel W. Jr. 2008."Panzer Commanders of the Western Front:German Tank Generals in WWII". Mechanicsburg PA, USA.StackPole Books. .
 
 
 

1900 births
1945 deaths
People from Hildesheim
People from the Province of Hanover
Lieutenant generals of the German Army (Wehrmacht)
German Army personnel of World War I
German Army personnel killed in World War II
Recipients of the clasp to the Iron Cross, 2nd class
Recipients of the Gold German Cross
Recipients of the Knight's Cross of the Iron Cross with Oak Leaves
Prussian Army personnel
Barons of Germany
Military personnel from Lower Saxony
German Army generals of World War II